The 16351 / 16352 Mumbai CSMT–Nagercoil Balaji Express is an Express train belonging to Southern Railway zone that runs between Chhatrapati Shivaji Maharaj Terminus, Mumbai and  in India. It is currently being operated with 16351/16352 train numbers on bi-weekly basis.

Service

The 16352/Nagercoil–Mumbai Chhatrapati Shivaji Maharaj Terminus Balaji Express has an average speed of 52 km/hr and covers 1947 km in 37h 15m.
The 16351/Mumbai Chhatrapati Shivaji Maharaj Terminus–Nagercoil Balaji Express has an average speed of 55 km/hr and covers 1947 km in 34h 55m.

Route & halts

The important halts of the train are:

Coach composition

The train has LHB rakes with a max speed of 130 kmph. Being an Express train its speed limit is 110 kmph.

This train will be reversed in both the directions at Arakkonam.

The train consists of 20 coaches:

 1 AC II Tier
 4 AC III Tier
 10 Sleeper coaches
 1 Pantry car
 2 General Unreserved
 2 Generator cars at both end

Traction

Both trains are hauled by a Kalyan Loco Shed-based WCAM-3 electric locomotive from Mumbai to Daund. From Daund, train is hauled by a Golden Rock Loco Shed-based WDP-4B diesel locomotive uptil Viluppuram. From Viluppuram, train is hauled by an Arakkonam Loco Shed-based WAP-4 & WAP-1 electric locomotive uptil Nagercoil, and vice versa.After getting upgraded to LHB coach now the train is running from end-to-end with Royapuram-based WAP-7 locomotive.

See also 

 Chhatrapati Shivaji Terminus
 Nagercoil Junction railway station
 Mumbai–Nagercoil Express

Notes

References

External links 

 16351/Mumbai CST - Nagercoil Balaji Express India Rail Info
 16352/Nagercoil - Mumbai CST Balaji Express India Rail Info

Transport in Mumbai
Transport in Nagercoil
Express trains in India
Rail transport in Karnataka
Rail transport in Maharashtra
Rail transport in Andhra Pradesh
Rail transport in Tamil Nadu
Railway services introduced in 1996